The 2016–17 1. FC Nürnberg season is the 117th season in the club's football history.

Review and events
In 2016–17 the club plays in the 2. Bundesliga.

The club also took part in the 2016–17 edition of the DFB-Pokal, the German Cup.

Friendly matches

Competitions

2. Bundesliga

League table

Matches

DFB-Pokal

Overall

Sources

External links
 2016–17 1. FC Nürnberg season at Weltfussball.de 
 2016–17 1. FC Nürnberg season at kicker.de 
 2016–17 1. FC Nürnberg season at Fussballdaten.de 

Nuremberg
1. FC Nürnberg seasons